Sir Jonathan Stephen Day  (born 23 April 1954) is a retired British Civil Servant lately serving as the Chairman of the Joint Intelligence Committee and Head of the Joint Intelligence Organisation at the Cabinet Office.

Day initially trained as a solicitor, and joined the Civil Service in 1979. During his career, Day worked in the Ministry of Defence, the Foreign & Commonwealth Office and the Cabinet Office, was seconded to NATO, and did a year's sabbatical at Harvard University.  Day retired at the end of November 2015, and was replaced by Charles Farr as Chair of the JIC.

Honours
Day was appointed Commander of the Order of the British Empire (CBE) in the 1999 New Year Honours for his contribution to the Strategic Defence Review as Director of Defence Policy at the MoD and was knighted in the 2016 New Year Honours.

References

External links 
 Ex-pupil's top post with MoD – This is Gloucestershire
 NATO Who's who?: Director Private Office – Jon Day (2001)

Living people
1954 births
British civil servants
Alumni of the University of Nottingham
Second Permanent Under-Secretaries of State for Defence
Civil servants in the Cabinet Office
Chairs of the Joint Intelligence Committee (United Kingdom)
Knights Bachelor
Commanders of the Order of the British Empire